Holger Geffers is a paralympic athlete from Germany competing mainly in category T12 sprints events.

Biography
Geffers competed in three Paralympics winning 2 silver and 1 bronze medal.  Her first games were in 1992 in Barcelona where she competed in the 100m and 400m.  She then won all her medals in the 1996 Summer Paralympics winning silvers as part of the German 4 × 100 m and 4 × 400 m relay teams and a bronze in the 200m as well as competing in the 100m and pentathlon.  She then made her last appearance in the 2000 Summer Paralympics where she competed in the 100m, 200m, 400m, 4 × 400 m and pentathlon.

References

Paralympic athletes of Germany
Athletes (track and field) at the 2000 Summer Paralympics
Athletes (track and field) at the 2004 Summer Paralympics
Paralympic silver medalists for Germany
Paralympic bronze medalists for Germany
Living people
Medalists at the 1996 Summer Paralympics
Athletes (track and field) at the 1996 Summer Paralympics
Year of birth missing (living people)
Paralympic medalists in athletics (track and field)
German male sprinters
Sprinters with limb difference
Paralympic sprinters